

The Taylorcraft Model 20 Ranch Wagon was a four-seat cabin monoplane designed and built by Taylorcraft Aircraft as a development of the earlier experimental Model 18. The Model 20 was constructed of moulded fibreglass over a tubular framework. It had a conventional landing gear and a nose-mounted 225 hp (168 kW) Continental O-470-J engine.

Variants
Model 20 Ranch Wagon
Utility model powered by a 225hp (168kW) Continental O-470-J engine.
Model 20 Zephyr 400
Tourer variant of 1958 with detailed changes from the basic Model 20.
Model 20AG Topper
Agricultural variant. Chemical hopper or tank in rear of cabin.
Model 20 Seabird
Floatplane variant.

Specifications (Ranch Wagon)

References

 

 

1950s United States civil utility aircraft
Ranch Wagon
Single-engined tractor aircraft
Aircraft first flown in 1955
High-wing aircraft
Conventional landing gear